Bikna is a village in the Bankura II CD block in the Bankura Sadar subdivision of the Bankura district in the state of West Bengal, India.

Geography

Location

Area overview
The map alongside shows the Bankura Sadar subdivision of Bankura district. Physiographically, this area is part of the Bankura Uplands in the west gradually merging with the Bankura-Bishnupur Rarh Plains in the north-east. The western portions are characterised by undulating terrain with many hills and ridges. The area is having a gradual descent from the Chota Nagpur Plateau. The soil is laterite red and hard beds are covered with scrub jungle and sal wood. Gradually it gives way to just uneven rolling lands but the soil continues to be lateritic. There are coal mines in the northern part, along the Damodar River. It is a predominantly rural area with 89% of the population living in rural areas and only 11% living in the urban areas.

Note: The map alongside presents some of the notable locations in the subdivision. All places marked in the map are linked in the larger full screen map.

Civic administration

CD block HQ
The headquarters of Bankura II CD block are located at Village Bikna in PO Kesiakole.

Demographics
According to the 2011 Census of India, Bikna had a total population of 3,876 of which 1,961 (51%) were males and 1915 (49%) were females. Population below 6 years was 450. The total number of literates in Bikna was 2,565 (74.87% of the population over 6 years).

Education
Manohari Devi Bajia DAV Public School is an English-medium coeducational higher secondary school following CBSE syllabus, established in 2001.

Bikna K.P.S. Vidyapith is a Bengali-medium coeducational institution established in 1964. It has facilities for teaching from class V to class XII. The school has 20 computers, a library with 3,000 books and a playground.

Transport
State Highway 9, running from Durgapur (in Paschim Bardhaman district) to Nayagram (in Jhargram district), passes through Bikna.

Bikna railway station is on the Bankura–Masagram line under the Adra railway division.

Healthcare
Kanchanpur Block Primary Health Centre, with 15 beds at Kanchanpur, is the major government medical facility in the Bankura II CD block. There are primary health centres at Narrah (with 4 beds) and Mankanali (with 10 beds).

Dhokra at Bikna
There is a small community living in Bikna who are involved in making dhokra handicrafts. Thirty-six related families live in this close-knit clan community. Their forefathers came from Chhotanagpur and are believed to have been nomads but now they are firmly settled here and have even adopted a Sanskritised surname ‘Karmakar’, which is close, in its meaning to the English surname ‘Smith’. They follow the cire purdue or lost wax process for making small metallic decorative items. They have been facing problems where their traditional furnaces for melting the metal was proving to be uneconomic and raising costs. An organization named NISTADS got involved in developing a new furnace for the Bikna artisans. The clash of modernity and traditions had its own problems. However, the modern furnace has found acceptance at both Bikna and Dwaraipur, some two hours by road, in Purba Bardhaman district, another place where around 20 families are involved in the dhokra craft.

The brighter side of the story is that a new global market is emerging in the United States and Europe for these unique dhokra products. People there like the rustic and primitive appearance with the original tribal flavour.

References

External links

  The Metallic World of Bikna Dokra Art

 Done

Villages in Bankura district